Lucifera is a female Latin name or epithet meaning 'light-bearing' and referring to:

Diana Lucifera, a title or aspect of the Roman goddess Diana
Lucifera, a daughter of Greek god Pluto, invented by Spenser in The Faerie Queen
Lucifera (comics), a 1970 Italian fumetti comic book demoness character
Lucifera: Demon Lover, 1972 Italian film
Lucifera (bacterium), a  genus of bacteria

See also

Lucifer